Manjhi Assembly constituency is an assembly constituency in Saran district in the Indian state of Bihar.

Overview
As per the Delimitation of Parliamentary and Assembly constituencies Order, 2008, No. 114 Manjhi Assembly constituency is composed of the following: Jalalpur Community Development Block; Sarbisarya, Sitalpur, Tajpur, Adarsh Gram Bareja, Madan Sath, Ghorhat, Dumari, Jaitpur, Inayatpur, Nasira, Baleshra, Daudpur, Lejuar, Bangara, Sonbarsa, Marhan, Manjhi Purbi, Manjhi Pashchimi and Kouru-Dhouru Gram Panchayats of Manjhi CD Block; Karhi, Manikpura and Lauwa Kala gram panchayats of Baniapur CD Block.

Manjhi Assembly constituency is a part of No. 19 Maharajganj (Lok Sabha constituency).

Members of Legislative Assembly

Election results

2020

1977-2010
In the 2015 state assembly elections Vijay Shanker Dubey of Congress [INC] won the Manjhi assembly seat defeating Keshav Singh of LJP. 
In the 2010 state assembly elections, Gautam Singh of JD(U) won the Manjhi assembly seat defeating his nearest rival Hem Narayan Singh of RJD. Contests in most years were multi cornered but only winners and runners up are being mentioned. Gautam Singh of JD(U) defeated Ravindra Nath Mishra of Congress in October 2005 and February 2005. Ravindranath Mishra, Independent, defeated Gautam Singh of SAP in 2000. Budhan Prasad Yadav of Congress defeated Ram Bahadur Singh of SJP(R) in 1995. Hazari Singh of JD defeated Budhan Prasad Yadav of Congress in 1990. Budhan Prasad Yadav, Independent, defeated Hazari Singh of JP in 1985. Rameshwar Dutta Sharma of Congress defeated Ram Bahadur Singh of Janata Party (JP) in 1980. Ram Bahadur Singh of JP defeated Rameshwar Dutta Sharma of Congress in 1977.

References

External links
 

Assembly constituencies of Bihar
Politics of Saran district